Medda is an Italian and Indian surname. A very small portion of people in India have this surname. It is said that a large number of people belonging to the Medda Clan in India moved to Europe and North America in the early 1900s . The Surname 'Medda' is derived from the word 'Medha' which means 'Intellect' or 'Wisdom' in Sanskrit. As an Italian surname it is of Sardinian origin where most people with the surname live in.

Notable people with the name include:

Ambra Medda (born 1981), Greek designer
Giampaolo Medda (1927–2017), Italian field hockey player
Mario Medda (1943–1981), Italian modern pentathlete
Michele Medda (born 1962), Italian comics writer

See also
Meddah

Italian-language surnames
Surnames of Indian origin